Matteo Mazzolini (born 9 January 2001) is a French footballer who plays as a midfielder.

Playing career
Mazzolini made his professional debut with Servette FC in a 5–1 Swiss Super League loss to FC Thun on 22 July 2020.

References

External links
 
 FFF Profile

Living people
2001 births
People from Saint-Quentin, Aisne
French footballers
France youth international footballers
Association football midfielders
Servette FC players
2. Liga Interregional players
Swiss Super League players
French expatriate footballers
French expatriate sportspeople in Switzerland
Expatriate footballers in Switzerland
Sportspeople from Aisne
Footballers from Hauts-de-France